Evan H. Caminker (born June 26, 1961, Los Angeles, California) is a Dean Emeritus of the University of Michigan Law School. As Dean, he succeeded Jeffrey S. Lehman, who resigned to become president of Cornell University. Caminker was appointed Dean just as the United States Supreme Court issued a landmark ruling upholding the constitutionality of the Law School's affirmative action admissions policies, which had been challenged in a lawsuit filed by the Center for Individual Rights.

Caminker earned a B.A. in political economy and environmental studies, summa cum laude, from the University of California-Los Angeles, and his law degree from Yale Law School, where he was a senior editor of the Yale Law Journal. He clerked for Judge William A. Norris of the United States Court of Appeals for the Ninth Circuit, and Justice William Brennan of the United States Supreme Court.

Prior to coming to the University of Michigan, Caminker was a faculty member at the UCLA School of Law. He has practiced law with the Center for Law in the Public Interest in Los Angeles, and as a deputy assistant attorney general in the United States Department of Justice. As a scholar, his research is focused on constitutional law and the nature of judicial decision making. Caminker describes his background in his early years as "a born-and-raised, beach volleyball-playing, suntan-searching Los Angelino."

See also 

 List of law clerks of the Supreme Court of the United States (Seat 3)

References

External links
University of Michigan Law School Faculty Profile: Evan H. Caminker
Dean's Welcome page at UM Law School

Living people
1961 births
Deans of law schools in the United States
Yale Law School alumni
Law clerks of the Supreme Court of the United States
University of California, Los Angeles alumni
Deans of University of Michigan Law School
University of Michigan Law School faculty
Lawyers from Los Angeles
UCLA School of Law faculty